FORCA - Forum of Civil Action Požega - is a non-profit organization founded in July 1999, and located in Požega, a town in west Serbia. At the moment, Forca represents an organisation that is highly respected in Serbia and abroad.

References

External links
http://www.forca.rs

Youth organizations based in Serbia
1999 establishments in Serbia
Požega, Serbia